Donggang is a city in the southeast of Liaoning Province in Northeast China. Situated on the coast of the Yellow Sea at the mouth of the Yalu River, it is located near the maritime border with North Korea.

Administrative Divisions

There are three subdistricts, 14 towns, and one ethnic township under the city's administration.

Subdistricts: Dadong Subdistrict, Xincheng Subdistrict, Xinxing Subdistrict

Towns: Gushan (Kushan), Qianyang, Changshan, Beijingzi, Yiquan, Huangtukan (Hwangtukan), Majiadian, Pusamiao, Longwangmiao, Xiaodianzi, Chang'an, Xinnong, Heigou, Shizijie

The only township is Helong Manchu Ethnic Township

Climate

References

External links

County-level divisions of Liaoning